The Missouri bellwether was a political phenomenon that noted that the state of Missouri voted for the winner in all but one U.S. presidential election from 1904 to 2004 (the exception being 1956). While states like Pennsylvania, Nevada, Florida and Wisconsin have been arguably stronger indicators of political trends in recent years, Missouri was a consistent swing state throughout the 20th century.  Prior to the 2008 elections, Lincoln County, Missouri was said to be the only bellwether county in a bellwether state. Missouri was also considered a bellwether of U.S. views on hot-button social issues such as stem cell research and school vouchers. Some economists also considered the state a bellwether for economic trends such as consumer confidence and unemployment.

Political history
From 1904 to 2004, Missouri's electoral votes always went to the winner of the presidential race, with only one exception: in 1956, during the landslide re-election of President Dwight Eisenhower, Missouri went to Illinois Governor Adlai Stevenson. The state's accuracy in voting with the national consensus includes the highly competitive elections of 1960, 1976, and 2000.

In 2006, Missouri's bellwether status gained renewed attention because of the 2006 Senate race between incumbent Republican Senator Jim Talent and Democratic State Auditor Claire McCaskill, which was considered vital to which party controls Congress. Additionally, Missouri had a ballot measure, Missouri Amendment Two, regarding stem cell research that drew national attention as an indicator of mainstream sentiment towards this controversial issue. On Election Day 2006, both McCaskill and Amendment 2 narrowly received majority support among Missouri voters. The victories of McCaskill and five other Democratic colleagues allowed their party to regain power in the U.S. Senate. Missouri was again the center of much media attention in 2012, after Rep. Todd Akin (R, MO-2) made controversial remarks regarding what he called "legitimate rape." McCaskill was seen as one of the most vulnerable Democratic incumbents prior to these remarks, but went on to win the 2012 election by nearly 16 points.

In the 2008 presidential primaries, the state voted for the major parties candidates who went on to secure their parties' nominations: John McCain (Republican) and Barack Obama (Democratic). Missouri did the same in 2016, voting for Hillary Clinton by a razor thin margin in the Democratic primary—actually tying with her opponent Bernie Sanders in one county—and voting narrowly for Donald Trump in the Republican primary. Despite her running mate having significant ties to the state, Clinton lost Missouri to Trump by more than 18 percentage points.

Possible causes
Location and demographics are most often cited as the cause of Missouri's bellwether status. In 2004, the Chicago Tribune called Missouri the "bellwether state that almost exactly mirrors the demographic, economic and political makeup of the nation." A microcosm of the country's current political makeup, Missouri has its two Blue "coasts" of St. Louis and Kansas City with Red middle and southern areas (see Red states and blue states).

Future of bellwether status
Missouri is no longer thought of as a perennial swing state. Since 1964, the only three Democrats it has backed have been Southerners: Lyndon B. Johnson, Jimmy Carter, and Bill Clinton. In 2008, Missouri narrowly voted for the losing candidate, Republican John McCain, despite a sizable electoral college win for Democrat Barack Obama. In 2012, Missouri favored losing candidate Mitt Romney by nearly 10 percentage points, despite another significant victory for Obama in the rest of the country.  In 2016 and 2020, Missouri again voted strongly Republican, this time for Donald Trump, despite Trump losing the latter election. This marked the third time in four presidential elections that Missouri supported a losing Republican. Missouri has not supported any Democratic candidate since Bill Clinton in 1996, despite there being three subsequent elections won by Democrats.

Missouri's accuracy rate for the last 29 presidential elections is now 89.66%. This percentage is on par with that of Ohio, which has voted for the winner of every presidential election since 1896, except in 1944, 1960 and 2020, with no Republican ever winning the White House without the state. Nevada has been carried by the winner of every presidential election since 1912, with only two exceptions: 1976 and 2016. New Mexico has voted for the winner of every presidential election since its statehood in 1912, except in 1976, 2000 and 2016.

One of the more important national phenomena that has not had the same impact in Missouri as in the rest of the country is the influx of immigrants, particularly Latinos. Analysts and journalists in recent times have pointed to states like Ohio, New Mexico, and Pennsylvania, as more accurate political and cultural bellwethers.

The 21st century Missouri electorate is also much less urbanized than in the 20th century. In 1900, the combined population of St. Louis (575,238) and Kansas City (163,752) was 24% of the population of Missouri (3,106,665), while by 1950 the combined population of St. Louis (856,796) and Kansas City (456,622) had grown to 33% of the population of the state (3,954,653). But shortly thereafter the population of St. Louis began a sharp decline, while that of Kansas City remained nearly static, such that the state is now dominated by rural, suburban, and small-city voters, who are generally more conservative. By 2000, the combined populations of St. Louis (348,189) and Kansas City (441,545) had declined to 14% of the population of Missouri (5,595,211).

This shift is a direct product of the small geographic size of St. Louis City, which is nearly unique among major urban centers in having locked its boundaries in 1876. When the population of St. Louis County is included in these figures, Missouri's ratio of major metropolitan residents to rural residents closely matches the nation as a whole.

Slate columnist Chris Suellentrop has said that the state now "isn't so much a bellwether as it is a weathervane: It doesn't swing the country, the country swings it..." and that Missouri is a better indicator of whether a trend is mainstream than of what the next new trend will be.

See also
 2012 United States presidential election in Missouri
 2008 United States presidential election in Missouri
 1956 United States presidential election in Missouri
 United States presidential elections in Missouri
 As Maine goes, so goes the nation
 Missouri demographics

References
 David Brian Robertson (2004) "Bellwether Politics in Missouri," The Forum: Vol. 2: No. 3, Article 2.

Footnotes

External links
A Mirror for the Nation
USA Today profile of the phenomenon
Bellwether states and counties from 1960 to 1996

United States presidential elections in Missouri
Opinion polling in the United States
Psephology
United States presidential elections terminology